The ornate eagle ray or reticulate eagle ray (Aetomylaeus vespertilio) is a species of large stingray of the family Myliobatidae.

Appearance
Aetomylaeus vespertilio has a maximum size of around 240 cm in disc width and a clearly distinct pattern of reticulate dark lines and rings on its back. If the extremely long tail is unbroken, it can considerably add to the maximum body length of 4m. Lacking a spine on the tail, it is deemed harmless to humans.

Distribution
Aetomylaeus vespertilio can be spotted  up to 110 meters deep along the coasts of Australia, China, India, Indonesia, Malaysia, Maldives, Mozambique, Palau, Philippines, Seychelles, South Africa, Taiwan, and Thailand. Despite the wide range it can be spotted at, it is rarely observed, and has been suspected to have had a large population decline within the past three generations. Currently, this species is considered Endangered by the International Union for Conservation of Nature (IUCN).

Threats
Aetomylaeus vespertilio are estimated to have a low fecundity similar to other myliobatids. They have a generation length of 15 years, and can grow as old as 24 years.

Although Aetomylaeus vespertilio was once common, they are now considered rare in areas such as the Gulf of Thailand. The largest threats they encounter are demersal fisheries, which are used frequently in the areas they live in. When caught, they are mostly retained and sold in fish markets. No species-specific conservation measures have taken place.

References

Sources
 Debelius, H. 2006, "Indian Ocean Reef Guide" 
 McGrouther, M. 2018, Australian museum website: Ornate Eagle Ray, Aetomylaeus vespertilio (Bleeker, 1852)
 Araujo, G., et al. 2018. "Citizen science sheds light on the cryptic ornate eagle ray Aetomylaeus vespertilio"

External links
 Species Description of Aetomylaeus vespertilio at www.shark-references.com
 

Aetomylaeus
Fish described in 1852
Taxonomy articles created by Polbot